Supreme Court of Appeal may refer to:

The  Supreme Court of Appeal, an appellate court in South Africa
The Newfoundland Supreme Court of Appeal
The West Virginia Supreme Court of Appeals

It may also refer to other Courts of Appeal.

Supreme courts